Charaxes grahamei is a butterfly in the family Nymphalidae. It is found in Tanzania, where it inhabits the eastern shores of Lake Tanganyika. The habitat consists of lowland and sub-montane forests.

The larvae probably feed on Scutia species.

Taxonomy
Charaxes grahamei is a member of the large species group Charaxes etheocles.
Closely related to Charaxes contrarius and Charaxes petersi.

References

Victor Gurney Logan Van Someren, 1969 Revisional notes on African Charaxes (Lepidoptera: Nymphalidae). Part V. Bulletin of the British Museum (Natural History) (Entomology)75-166.

External links
Charaxes grahamei images at Consortium for the Barcode of Life
Charaxes grahamei f. lacteata images at BOLD
Charaxes grahamei blue form images at BOLD
Images of C. grahamei Royal Museum for Central Africa (Albertine Rift Project)

Butterflies described in 1969
grahamei
Endemic fauna of Tanzania
Butterflies of Africa